Serruria glomerata, the cluster spiderhead, is a flower-bearing shrub that belongs to the genus Serruria and forms part of the fynbos. The plant is native to the Western Cape, it occurs on the Cape Flats and Cape Peninsula. The shrub is erect and grows only 40 cm tall and bears flowers from August to October.

Fire destroys the plant but the seeds survive. Two months after flowering, the fruit falls off and ants disperse the seeds. They store the seeds in their nests. The plant is unisexual. Pollination takes place through the action of insects. The plant grows in sandy soil at altitudes of 0–330 m.

In Afrikaans it is known as trosspinnekopbos.

References

External links 

glomerata